Robin Walker is a British politician.

Robin Walker may also refer to:
Robin Walker (game designer), creator of the Team Fortress series of computer games
Robin Walker, Irish architect, best known for his work with firm Scott Tallon Walker

See also
Rob Walker (disambiguation)